Bangalore Urban district is the most densely populated district in the Indian state of Karnataka. It is surrounded by the Bangalore Rural district on the east and north, the Ramanagara district on the west and the Krishnagiri district of Tamil Nadu on the south. Bangalore Urban district came into being in 1986, with the partition of the erstwhile Bangalore district into Bangalore Urban and Bangalore Rural districts. Bangalore Urban has five taluks: Hebbala (Bangalore North), Kengeri (Bangalore South), Krishnarajapura (Bangalore East), Yelahanka (Bangalore North Additional) and Anekal.  The city of Bangalore is situated in the Bangalore Urban district and is the headquarters of the district. The district has 2 divisions, 5 talukas, 17 hoblies, 872 villages, 11 rural habitations, 5 towns, 1 tier-three city and 1 tier-one city, administered by 96 Village Panchayats (Grama Panchayitis) 97 Taluk Panchayats (Taluk Panchayitis), 5 Town Municipal Councils (Purasabes), 1 City Municipal Council (Nagarasabe) and 1 City Corporation (Mahanagara Palike).

The district had a population of 6,537,124 of which 88.11% is urban as of 2001. As of Census 2011, its population has increased to 9,621,551, with a sex-ratio of 908 females/males, the lowest in the state and its density is 4,378 people per square km.

List of Villages

Geography

Climate
The climate here is moderate.

Water 
According to the National Wetland Atlas (2010) the district has two main rivers and 580 wetlands.

Demographics
According to the 2011 census Bangalore Urban district has a population of 9,621,551, roughly equal to the nation of Belarus. This gives it a ranking of third in India (out of a total of 640). Its population growth rate over the decade 2001-2011 was 46.68%. Bangalore has a sex ratio of 908 females for every 1000 males, and a literacy rate of 88.48%. Scheduled Castes and Scheduled Tribes make up 12.46% and 1.98% of the population respectively.

At the time of the 2011 census, 44.47% of the population spoke Kannada, 13.20% Tamil, 15.99% Telugu, 12.11% Urdu, 4.55% Hindi, 2.94% Malayalam and 1.92% Marathi as their first language.

Temples
 Gavi Gangadhareshwara Temple
 Dodda Basavana Gudi
 Halasuru Someshwara Temple, Bangalore
 ISKCON Temple Bangalore
 Kote Venkataramana Temple, Bangalore
 Banashankari Amma Temple

See also
 Ajjanahalli, Bangalore South
 Bangalore Division

References

External links

Official website of Bangalore Urban District

 
Districts of Karnataka
1986 establishments in Karnataka